The 46th Battalion (South Saskatchewan), CEF, was an infantry battalion of the Canadian Expeditionary Force during the Great War.

History 
The 46th Battalion was authorized on 7 November 1914 and embarked for Britain on 23 October 1915. On 11 August 1916 it disembarked in France, where it fought with the 10th Infantry Brigade, 4th Canadian Division in France and Flanders until the end of the war. The battalion was disbanded on 30 August 1920.

The unit has come to be known as "The Suicide Battalion". The 46th Battalion lost 1,433 killed and 3,484 wounded – a casualty rate of 91.5 percent in 27 months.

The battalion recruited throughout Saskatchewan and was mobilized at Moose Jaw, Saskatchewan.

The 46th Battalion had two officers commanding:
Lieutenant-Colonel H. Snell, 22 October 1915 – 29 August 1916
Lieutenant-Colonel H.J. Dawson, CMG, DSO, 29 August 1916-Demobilization

One member of the 46th Battalion was awarded the Victoria Cross. Sergeant Hugh Cairns was posthumously awarded the Victoria Cross for his actions at Valenciennes on 1 November 1918.

Battle Honours 
The 46th Battalion was awarded the following battle honours:
SOMME, 1916
Ancre Heights
Ancre, 1916
ARRAS, 1917, '18
Vimy, 1917
HILL 70
Ypres, 1917
Passchendaele
AMIENS
Scarpe, 1918
Drocourt-Quéant
HINDENBURG LINE
Canal du Nord
VALENCIENNES
FRANCE AND FLANDERS, 1916-18

Perpetuation 
The perpetuation of the 46th Battalion was assigned in 1920 to 2nd Battalion (46th Battalion, CEF), The South Saskatchewan Regiment, and it is now perpetuated by The Saskatchewan Dragoons.

 2nd Battalion (46th Battalion, CEF), The South Saskatchewan Regiment: 1920–1924
 1st Battalion (46th Battalion, CEF), The King's Own Rifles of Canada: 1924–1936
 The King's Own Rifles of Canada (MG): 1936–1942
 The King's Own Rifles of Canada: 1942–1946
 20th (Saskatchewan) Armoured Regiment, RCAC: 1946–1949
 20th Saskatchewan Armoured Regiment: 1949–1954
 The Saskatchewan Dragoons (20th Armoured Regiment): 1954–1958
 The Saskatchewan Dragoons: 1958–present

See also 

 List of infantry battalions in the Canadian Expeditionary Force

References

Sources
Canadian Expeditionary Force 1914-1919 by Col. G.W.L. Nicholson, CD, Queen's Printer, Ottawa, Ontario, 1962

Military units and formations of Saskatchewan
046